Healing Hands of Time is the 42nd studio album by country singer Willie Nelson.

Track listing
All tracks composed by Willie Nelson, except where indicated.

"Funny How Time Slips Away" - 5:30
"Crazy" - 3:30
"Night Life" (Paul Buskirk, Walter Breeland, Nelson) - 3:56
"Healing Hands of Time" - 3:45
"(How Will I Know) I'm Falling in Love Again" - 4:14
"All the Things You Are" (Jerome Kern, Oscar Hammerstein II) - 2:51
"Oh, What It Seemed to Be" (Bennie Benjamin, Frankie Carle, George David Weiss) - 3:21
"If I Had My Way" (James Kendis, Lou Klein) - 3:23
"I'll Be Seeing You" (Irving Kahal, Sammy Fain) - 3:02
"There Are Worse Things Than Being Alone" - 4:08

Personnel
Willie Nelson - guitar, vocals
Eddie Bayers - drums
Oscar Brashear - trumpet
Rosemary Butler - vocals
David Campbell - arranger, conductor
Valerie Carter - vocals
John Clark - flute
Jonathan Clark - flute, horn, oboe
Craig Doerge - piano
Doug Haywood - vocals
Suzie Katayama - orchestra manager
Daniel Kelley - horn, French horn
Michael Lang - piano, soloist
Arnold McCuller - vocals
Billy Joe Walker, Jr. - acoustic guitar, guitar
Glenn Worf - bass guitar
Reggie Young - electric guitar

Chart performance

Weekly charts

Year-end charts

References

1994 albums
Willie Nelson albums
Albums arranged by David Campbell (composer)
Albums produced by Jimmy Bowen
Capitol Records albums
Albums recorded at Capitol Studios